Pak Kret is a district (amphoe) in the northeastern part of Nonthaburi province, central Thailand.

Geography

The district is in the northeast of the province. It borders (from north clockwise) the districts Lat Lum Kaeo and Mueang Pathum Thani of Pathum Thani province, Don Mueang and Lak Si of Bangkok, and Mueang Nonthaburi and Bang Bua Thong of Nonthaburi.

The district is crossed by the Chao Phraya River. A large oxbow of the river has been shortened by a canal, Khlong Lat Kret, dug in 1722 in the Ayuthaya Era, to form the island of Ko Kret.

Administration
The district is divided into 12 sub-districts (tambons). These are further subdivided into 85 villages (mubans).

Five of the tambons covering 34 villages belong to the city (thesaban nakhon) of Pak Kret. Bang Phlap itself has had township (thesaban tambon) status since 2013. The other six tambons are each administered by a Tambon Administrative Organization (TAO).

Education
A partial list of primary and secondary schools in Pak Kret:
Pakkred Secondary School
Nawamintarachinuthid Horwang Nonthaburi School (also called Horwangnon)
Suan Kularb Wittayalai Nonthaburi School (also called Suannon)
Triamudom Suksa Nomklao Nonthaburi School (also called Triam Nom Non)
Wat Paramaiyikawat School
Wat Sala Kun School
Pichaya Suksa School
International School Bangkok
Rose Marie Academy
Saint Francis Xavier School
Chonprathanwittaya School

References

External links

 
 Impact Arena, Exhibition and Convention Center
 Site dedicated to Muang Thong Thani

Pak Kret